The following is a list of the people (only men, as of 2014) that have fulfilled the role of mayor or its temporal equivalent in the Transylvanian city of Brașov. Entries followed by a cross sign (†) mean that the respective person deceased while in office.

Beginnings to the 19th century

Since the Saxon settlement in Transylvania carried out by Hungarian king Géza II in the late 12th and early 13th centuries, their records have been a very important source of information (such as the following) about affairs in the region at the time, that would otherwise have been lost. The following section presents, in chronological order, the people that have held the title of "judge" ("judex civitatis" in Latin; head of the city administration's main structure, the Magistrate) since the earliest of these records (but almost a century and a half after the colonization), up to the 19th century, time during which the administration has hardly changed.

Judges 

 Nicolaus filius Pauli olim iudex, prior to 1360 
 Jacobus iudex, 1364, 1368, 1380, 1387 
 Johannes Sydenswancz, 1397–1398, 1403–1406, 1412 
 Valentinus Godfridi iudex, 1413, 1415, 1419 
 Nicolaus Wyroch, 1420 
 Valentinus Godfridi iudex, 1424 
 Simon Revdel, 1425 
 Valentinus Godfridi iudex, 1427 
 Georgius dictus Burger, 1435 
 Petrus Anthonii iudex, 1439–1440 
 Georgius iudex, 1444 
 Petrus comes, alias iudex, prior to 1447 
 Caspar Craus, alias iudex, prior to 1455 
 Georgius, condam iudex, prior to 1456 
 Georg Lang, iudex, 1462 
 Laurentius Pereczswthew, 1467 
 Petrus Revel, iudex, 1475 
 Petrus Werek, 1483 
 Petrus Kewel, 1484 
 Symon Sartor, 1488 
 Bartholomeus Schunkabunk, 1494 
 Simon Sartor, 1497 
 Petrus Beer (Vrsinus), 1499–1500 
 Georgius Ewthwes, 1502 
 Johannes Schirmer, 1506–1507 
 Matthias Funifex (Zeler), 1509–1510 
 Johannes Benkner, 1511–1513 
 Johannes Schirmer, 1514 
 Johannes Benkner, 1515, 1517–1518 
 Hanns Balwes, 1519 
 Johannes Benkner, 1520–1521 
 Hans Schirmer, Richter, 1522 
 Johannes Benkner, 1523 
 Valentinus Cheres, 1524 
 Clemens Weyrauch, 1525–1526 
 Peter Engel, 1527 
 Lucas Hirscher, 1528–1539 
 Martinus Drauth, 1540 
 Lucas Hirscher, până la 19.04.1541 
 Johannes Fuchs, 1541–1544 
 Vincentius Schneider, 1545–1546 
 Johannes Benkner, 1547–1548 
 Vincentius Schneider, 1549 2 
 Johannes Benkner, 1550–1552 
 Simon Goldschmidt, 1553 
 Michael Roth, 1554 
 Johannes Benkner, 1555–1560 
 Lukas Hirscher, 1561–1562 
 Simon Goldschmidt, 1563 
 Lukas Hirscher, 1564 
 Johannes Benkner, 1565 
 Simon Goldschmidt, 1566 
 Lukas Hirscher, 1567–1568 
 Johann Graeff, 1569–1570 
 Lukas Hirscher, 1571–1589 
 Cyrillus Greißing, 1590 
 Johannes Fuchs, 1590–1591 
 Cyrillus Greißing, 1592–1594 
 Johann Chrestels, 1595 
 Cyrillus Greißing, 1595 
 Valentin Hirscher, 1596–1604 
 Johannes Draudt, 1605–1607 
 Matthias Fronius, 1608–1609 
 Johannes Draudt, 1609–1611 
 Michael Weiß, 1612 
 Johannes Draudt, 1613 
 Johannes Greißing, 1614 
 Johann Chrestels, 1615–1619 
 Johannes Draudt, 1620 
 Johann Chrestels, 1621–1624 
 Daniel Fronius, 1625–1627 
 Christianus Hirscher, 1628–1629 
 Michael Goldschmidt, 1630–1632 
 Christianus Hirscher, 1635 
 Michael Goldschmidt, 1639 
 Christianus Hirscher, 1641 
 Michael Herrmann, 1647, 1654–1655 
 Michael Goldschmidt, 1657–1658 
 Michael Herrmann, 1659–28.08.1660 (†) 
 Joseph Bolthosch, 1661 
 David Czako, 1662–1663 
 Simon Drauth, 1664 
 David Czako, 1665 
 Georgius Chrestels, 1666–1667 
 David Czako, 1668 
 Georgius Chrestels, 1669 
 David Czako, 1670–1672 
 Simon Dietrich, 1673–1674 
 David Czako, 1675–1676 
 Simon Dietrich, 1677–1679 
 Georgius Drauth, 1680–1685 
 Michael Filstich, 1686–1688 3 
 Simon Draudt, 1689–1690 
 Michael Filstich, 1691 
 Simon Drauth, 1692 
 Michael Filstich, 1693 
 Johannes Mankesch, 1694–24.11.1699 (†) 
 Georgius Jeckel, 1700 
 Andreas Rheter, 1701–19.01.1707 (†) 
 Georgius Jeckel, până la 28.08.1708 (†) 
 Bartholomeus Seuler, 1709–1710 
 Georgius Drauth, 1711–1714 
 Stephan Filstich, 1715–1717 
 Georgius Drauth, 1718–1719 
 Stephan Filstich, 1720 
 Georgius Drauth, 1721 
 Stephan Filstich, 1722–1723 
 Georgius Drauth, 1724–1727 
 Stephan Filstich, 1728–1732 
 Lucas Seuler M.D., 1733 
 Stephanus Filstich, 1734–1736 
 Samuel Herberth, 1737–1740 
 Paulus Chrestels, 1741–1742 
 Samuel Herberth, 1743–1744 
 Paulus Chrestels, până la 26.12.1745 (†) 
 Samuel Herberth de Herbertsheim, 1746–1747 
 Martinus Closius, 1748–29.09.1749 (†) 
 Christoph von Seewaldt, 1751–1754 
 Johann Seuler von Seulen, 1755–1757 
 Andreas Tartler, 1758–1769 
 Joseph Traugott de Schobeln, 1770–1777 
 Michael Enyeter, 8.10.1778–26.09.1781 
 Joseph Traugott de Schobeln, 27.09.1781–9.08.1783 (†) 
 Michael Fronius, 21.08.1783–18.04.1786 
 Joseph August Drauth, 1.06.1786–1789 
 Johann Theophil Wentzel, 27.05.1789–1790 
 Michael Traugott Fronius, 23.04.1790–28.06.1799 (†) 
 Georg Franz Clompe, 29.07.1799–31.10.1822

Mid-19th century to World War I

Superior judges 

Johann Jakob Mylius, 1.11.1822–21.05.1832 (†) 
Johann Georg de Trauschenfels, 21.05.1832–24.08.1841 (†) 
Joseph Wentzel, 25.10.1841–1846 
Johann Georg von Albrichsfeld, 10.12.1846–6.12.1854

Mayors 

Franz von Schobeln, 6.12.1854–3.03.1859 
Friedrich Fabritius, 3.03.1859–23.04.1861

Superior judges of the city and of the district 

Friedrich Fabritius, 23.04.1861–1868 
Georg Dück, 1.02.1869–31.12.1871 
Karl Schnell, 1.01.1872–18.12.1876 (retired)

Mayors 

Johann Gött, 26.10.1876–1.12.1879 (retired) 
Franz Brenner von Brennerberg, 19.11.1879–28.05.1896 (retired) 
Karl Jacobi, 15.06.1896–20.07.1898 (retired) 
Franz Hiemesch, 1.10.1898–4.04.1911 (†) 
dr. Karl Ernst Schnell 10.07.1911–28.08.1916 
dr. Gheorghe Baiulescu, 29.08.1916–08.10.1916 
dr. Karl Ernst Schnell, 9.10.1916–1926*

Early 20th century 

Following World War I, Brașov, along with entire Transylvania, became part of the enlarged Kingdom of Romania.

Delegate mayors 

 Dr. Carol Schnell (delegate mayor), 1918–1926 
 Emil Socaciu (delegate mayor), 1926

Mayors 

 Dr. Constantin Moga, 1926–1928; start of local administration in the Romanian language 
 Dr. Carol Schnell (mayor's endorser), 1928 (1.09–16.10) 
 Dr. Sterie Stinghe, 1928–1929 
 Gheorghe Cuteanu, 1929–1931

Presidents of the interimary committee 

 Iuliu Suciu, 1931–22.06.1932 
 Dr. Ioan Garoiu, 22.06.1932–15.10.1932 
 Dr. Cornel Voicu (mayor), 1932–21.03.1934 
 Dr. Filimon Bogdan, 21.03.1934–31.08.1934 
 C. Dumitrescu Pârvu, 31.08.1934–24.05.1935 
 Dr. Tarquiniu Priscu, 1935–1938 
 Dr. Ioan Latciu (delegate mayor), 6.01.1938–11.02.1938 
 Dr. Virgil Voicu (delegate mayor), 13.02.1938–17.02.1938

World War II and communist rule

Military delegates 

Lt. Col. Victor Nanu, 18.02.1938–1940

Pending Victor Nanu, other military personnel have taken up the role of mayor until the end of the war.

Mayors of the communist regime 

 Cucu Alexandru, 1945–1948; 
 Tasedeanu Stefan, 1948–1949; 
 Jiga Vasile, 1949–1950; 
 Bujoreanu Florea, 1950–1952;
 Goga, 1952–1954; 
 Cadar Alexandru, 1954–1955; 
 Halga Sabin, 1955–1956; 
 Cadar Alexandru, 1956–1958; 
 Caraba Vicentiu, 1958–1960; 
 Moldovan Pavel, 1960–1961; 
 Dumitrescu Gheorghe, 1961–1967; 
 Huluban Nicolae, 1967–1968; 
 Cârtîna Constantin, 1968–1971; 
 Sutu Gheorghe, 1971–1974; 
 Dumitrache Gheorghe, 1974–1977; 
 Draghici Ioan, 1977–1984; 
 Calancea Dumitru, 1984–1987; 
 Cioboiu Adrian, 1987–1989.

Recent years

Post-communist delegate mayors 

 Sălăjan Cornel, 1990;
 Costin Marius, 1990–1991; 
 Chiosa Vasile, 1991;
 Gonţea Ion, 1991–februarie 1992.

Mayors 

Starting in 1992, mayors of the city as well as local counsellors are publicly elected every 4 years.

 Adrian Moruzi, 1992–1996; 
 Ioan Ghişe, 1996–2004;
 George Scripcaru, 2004–2020;
 Allen Coliban, 2020–present.

References 

All information was extracted from the Brașov city hall's official website which can be found online on the link below. Part of the information was compiled by local historian Gernot Nussbächer and published in his 1999 book "Kronstadt".

 Gernot Nussbächer, Kronstadt (1999)
 https://web.archive.org/web/20170630062124/http://brasovcity.ro/documente/municipiu/primarii-brasovului.pdf

Brasov